P'iti (Quechua for dividing by pulling powerfully to the extremes; gap, interruption, also spelled Piti) is a  mountain in the Andes of Peru. It is situated in the Lima Region, Huarochirí Province, Huanza District. P'iti lies northeast of a lake named P'itiqucha.

References 

Mountains of Peru
Mountains of Lima Region